The Adelaide Derby is an intra-city local derby between South Australia's two most historically successful football (soccer) clubs: Adelaide City and West Adelaide. The two sides were the first from the state to compete at national level when they became founding members of the National Soccer League in 1977. For more than 20 years, it was Adelaide's only intra-city derby. The rivalry was born before the national league developed however, when they competed in the state's first division. Adelaide City, then known as Adelaide Juventus were a club backed by Adelaide's Italian community, while West Adelaide Hellas drew their support from the city's Greek population. Since the demise of the NSL, the two clubs have returned to South Australian competition and continue their rivalry in the National Premier Leagues.

History

State dominance: A rivalry is born
Adelaide City was founded as Juventus in 1946 by a group of Italian migrants, some of whom had previously been members of a club called Savoia. In 1953, the club won its first South Australian first division title and its first Federation Cup. Juventus had won six league titles and five cups by the early 1960s. West Adelaide Hellas was founded in 1962 by some Greek migrants who had previously been part of the Hellenic Olympic club, banned by the South Australian Soccer Federation for crowd violence. The Greek club merged with the original West Adelaide, which was founded in 1910 and played home games at Hindmarsh Stadium. Like Juventus, it too quickly obtained promotion to the first division and the clubs established their rivalry.

Juventus and Hellas' first meeting came in September 1963, before the newly formed Hellas had even played its first game in the top tier. West Adelaide reached the final of that year's Federation Cup as it took out the second-tier competition. The final pit Hellas against Juventus but the dominant Italians proved too good for the upstarts, winning 5–1 in the final.  Juventus won the first division that year – their seventh title.

Juventus also won the first league meeting between the two teams, a 2–0 away victory on 18 April 1964. However, later in the year, Hellas was to draw blood against its new rival for the first time. The sides again came face-to-face in the Federation Cup as they had the previous year. The first match ended in a 3-3 deadlock that extra time was unable to resolve, so a replay was contested. Hellas won 2-1 a week later and went on to win its first cup title. However, Juventus again won the league that year.

Again the two sides came against one another in the 1965 Federation Cup semi-final, Juventus this time exacting revenge and going on to win the title. In 1966, West Adelaide won the first division for the first time, taking out wins against Juventus home and away in the process. The first match between the pair that season finished 6–3 to Hellas and remains the highest scoring derby to date. The following year, Hellas thumped Juventus 4–0 in the league (to date its biggest derby win) and also demolished the Italian club 3–0 in the Federation Cup final. However, Juventus still managed to win the league, one point ahead of second-placed Hellas.

West Adelaide won the next two league championships, before Juventus won the league again in 1970. It also defeated Hellas in the Federation Cup final to claim the double. The two clubs had by now established themselves as South Australia's most powerful. Hellas won the 1971 competition, seven points clear of second-placed Juventus, but the Italian-backed club got revenge in the cup, beating Hellas in the final for the second straight season. Juventus would go on to win four Federation Cup finals in a row, all against West Adelaide.

Between 1966 and 1976, the two clubs won all but one league championship between them. Only Polonia Adelaide managed to break their dominance for a single season, winning the league in 1975.

The derby goes national
Adelaide City, as the renamed Juventus was known, and West Adelaide became foundation members of the National Soccer League in 1977. On 20 June, the two clubs ran out for the first time against one another in a national competition. In front of 12,328 spectators, Adelaide City trounced West Adelaide 4–1 with goals from Brian Northcote, Agenor Muniz, Dixie Deans and John Nyskohus. Neil McGachey scored the only goal for Hellas. The match did not lack star quality, with Liverpool legend Graeme Souness lining up for West Adelaide. The return game at Olympic Sports Field finished 2-2. West Adelaide won an NSL Cup tie between the two clubs however, 3-2 after extra time. The two clubs were not allowed by the South Australian Soccer Federation to enter teams in the state competition that year, although they both re-entered in South Australia's second tier in 1978.

Arguably the biggest derby ever played between the two clubs was contested in the final round of the 1978 National Soccer League season. West Adelaide needed just a draw to win its first NSL title and become the first Adelaide club, and first outside New South Wales, to be crowned Australian champion. Adelaide City couldn't win the league but needed to win the game to deny its rival the title. John Perin scored the opening goal for the Italian-backed club with a long-range strike and City appeared destined to spoil West's party until Vic Bozanić lobbed home an equaliser five minutes from time. A crowd of 16,251 watched the game at Hindmarsh Stadium and it remains the highest recorded attendance of any derby between the two clubs.

West Adelaide wouldn't win another league derby until 1982. The two clubs also met semi-frequently in the NSL Cup, Hellas knocking City out of the 1982 and 1983 editions before the Black and Whites picked up a win in a new group phase format in 1984. Derby crowds dropped in the mid 1980s and only 3500 spectators watched City defeat West 4–1 at Olympic Sports Field in June 1985, where a young Aurelio Vidmar scored twice in his first derby. The NSL had been split into two conferences from 1984 to 1986 and the two Adelaide clubs competed alongside sides from Victoria and Queensland in the Southern conference. When the league's administrators chose to return to a single division for the 1987 season, they cut the number of clubs and relegated those which were not retained to their respective state leagues.

City had won its first league title in 1986 – a 2–1 loss to West Adelaide late in the season not withstanding. However, West Adelaide had struggled, finishing fourth from bottom in the conference. It was not included in the NSL for 1987 and did not return until the 1989–90 season, the first time the NSL was played in summer. West Adelaide's return to the national league was short-lived. The club finished second-to-last and lost both derbies on its return, although crowds had more than doubled since the mid-1980s. More than 10,000 watched the first derby at Hindmarsh Stadium where City had moved and would play out the rest of its time in the NSL. To make the NSL return more bitter for West, it also lost the 1989–90 NSL Cup Round of 16 game 3–0 to Adelaide City.

City soars, West struggles
After another year in state league purgatory, West Adelaide returned to the NSL for the 1991–92 season. Again, City was ruthless in front of a 10,000-strong crowd at Hindmarsh, winning 4–1 with two goals apiece from club legend Sergio Melta and a young Carl Veart. Adelaide City would go on to win its second NSL title that season but West Adelaide was not going to be a pushover in the return fixture. More than 13,000 attended the game on 7 January 1992 and it was a future Socceroo striker Paul Agostino, then just 16 years old, who would get on to the end of a through ball and finish calmly past goalkeeper Robert Zabica to win the game 1-0 for West.

Both Adelaide City and West Adelaide made the finals in 1992–93 and the play-offs would pit the two Adelaide sides against one another at the business end of the season for the first time. It was Hellas that won the first leg of the semi-final but Adelaide City progressed after winning the second leg 2–1, having finished higher on the table after the minor round. Steve Maxwell scored the brace that ultimately helped City get past their local rivals although the season ended with a disappointing 1-0 grand final defeat to Marconi.

Adelaide City won another derby in December 1993; a 4-0 demolition. West Adelaide claimed glory two months later though, when Socceroo striker Greg Brown scored a brace in front of a packed Hindmarsh Stadium. His side won 2–0; City again won the championship. The two clubs also played off in a two-legged NSL Cup tie which City won 4–3 on aggregate.

The rest of the 1990s were particularly lean for West Adelaide as their crosstown rivals regularly finished among the top five and played finals football. West won the first derby of the 1994–95 season but the club's supporters did not realise they would only ever win one more NSL game against City again. West knocked City out of the 1994-95 NSL Cup on away goals after two drawn games, despite both matches being played at Hindmarsh Stadium. City won two derbies in each of the 1995–96 and 1996–97 seasons.

In 1998, West Adelaide rebranded itself as the Adelaide Sharks, in an attempt to attract more broadbased support beyond their traditional but dwindling base in Adelaide's Greek community. They ended City's run of derby wins with a 1–1 draw in their first derby under the Sharks moniker. Nathan Day, who would later play for City, scored West's goal. Adelaide City smashed the Sharks 5–0 in the first derby of the 1998–99 season. The result was the most one-sided in all 40 NSL games the two sides contested. There would only ever again be one more such derby in the national league.

Adelaide Sharks defeated City 1-0 thanks to a late Aleksandar Đurić goal on 4 April 1999. The crowd was just 3982 at Hindmarsh Stadium, almost 5000 less than watched the earlier fixture between the two clubs just three and a half months prior and a world removed from the crowds of more than 10,000 fans the derbies had traditionally attracted. Just a week before the 1999–00 season was due to start, the Sharks withdrew from the competition – bankrupt.

City would remain in the NSL until 2003 when it too pulled out of the competition, just weeks before the final edition was about to begin. It was replaced in the NSL by the newly formed Adelaide United, a club backed by the South Australian Soccer Federation and South Australian businessman and former Adelaide City sponsor Gordon Pickard. The April 1999 derby remains the last time two Adelaide clubs faced each other in a national league.

The derby is reborn
Adelaide City returned its focus to the South Australian Premier League in 2004 upon withdrawing from the NSL. West Adelaide management legally separated its senior and junior arms into two clubs before the Sharks entered administration and ultimately folded in 1999.

West Adelaide's juniors survived through a merger with state league club Adelaide Olympic. In 2008, nine years since the last Adelaide derby was played in the NSL, West Adelaide ended its arrangement with Olympic and returned to fielding senior teams in the third tier of the South Australian competition. West Adelaide Hellas eventually won promotion back to the South Australian first tier, now called the National Premier Leagues South Australia, for the 2014 season.

West was drawn to host Adelaide City at its temporary home ground at West Beach in round 1 of its first season back in South Australia's top flight. The match was promoted in local media and attracted a crowd of 2900 – significantly higher than the average state league crowd. That match ended 1-1 and West Adelaide won the return leg at Adelaide City Park later in the season. The two clubs reached the final of the 2014 Federation Cup, which served as South Australia's qualifier to the inaugural FFA Cup. Adelaide City won the highly anticipated match 4–1 at Hindmarsh Stadium and went on to defeat Western Sydney Wanderers in the FFA Cup; becoming the first state league side to defeat an A-League club.

West Adelaide won its first championship since its return from bankruptcy the following season, despite a 4–0 loss to Adelaide City during the season. West also managed to knock City out of the cup, preventing the Black and Whites from embarking on a second FFA Cup campaign. Adelaide City responded by winning the next five derbies, including a 6-0 demolition in the final round of the 2017 FFSA season – the greatest ever winning margin in derby history.

Ahead of the first derby of the 2018 season, the clubs announced a perpetual trophy had been created to recognise the historical significance of the derby. Adelaide City defeated West Adelaide 4–0 at home on 17 March to claim the Real Adelaide Derby Cup.

Results

Records and Statistics

References

Adelaide City FC
West Adelaide SC
Australian soccer rivalries
Sport in Adelaide
Soccer in South Australia